INH or inh may refer to:

 Ingush language, ISO 639 code
 Inhambane Airport, Mozambique, IATA code INH
 Isonicotinic acid hydrazide or isoniazid, an antibiotic for treatment of tuberculosis

Historic uses
 Dutch East Indies, former FIFA country code INH
 Instituto Nacional de Hidrocarburos (INH, National Hydrocarbons Institute, 1980–1995), Spanish state-owned petroleum management company